Abdou-Malick Korodowou (born 15 December 1990) is a Togolese former professional footballer, who played as a defensive midfielder. He made one appearance for the Togo national team in 2010.

Club career
Born in Lomé, Korodowou began his career with Planète Foot and signed in summer 2006 for AS Cannes. After only four appearances in his two years by AS Cannes in the Championnat National he signed for FC Wiltz 71 in the Luxembourger football. He played six games in the 2010–11 season for Wiltz in the BGL Ligue and returned in summer 2011 to French Championnat de France amateur club Monts d'Or Azergues Foot.

International career
Korodowou played in the age of fifteen the 2007 FIFA U-17 World Cup in South Korea. On 13 May 2010, he earned his first call-up for the Togo national team for the Corsica Cup 2010 and made his debut on 21 May 2010 against Gabon.

References

1990 births
Living people
Sportspeople from Lomé
Association football midfielders
Togolese footballers
Togo international footballers
AS Cannes players
GOAL FC players
Togolese expatriate footballers
Togolese expatriate sportspeople in France
Expatriate footballers in France
Expatriate footballers in Luxembourg
21st-century Togolese people